Eukaryotic translation initiation factor 3, subunit M (eIF3m) also known as PCI domain containing 1 (herpesvirus entry mediator) (PCID1), is a protein that in humans is encoded by the EIF3M gene.

HFLB5 encodes a broadly expressed protein containing putative membrane fusion domains that acts as a receptor or coreceptor for entry of herpes simplex virus (HSV).

See also 
Eukaryotic initiation factor 3 (eIF3)

References

Further reading

External links